The 2016 Fórmula Truck season was the 21st Fórmula Truck season.

Teams and drivers
All drivers were Brazilian-registered.

Calendar and results
All races were held in Brazil.

References

External links
  

2016 in Brazilian motorsport
2016